Gerhard Wagner (born 1945) is a German-American physicist currently the Elkan Rogers Blout Professor of Biological Chemistry and Molecular Pharmacology at Harvard Medical School and is an Elected Fellow of the American Association for the Advancement of Science, German National Academy of Sciences Leopoldina, American Academy of Arts and Sciences, National Academy of Sciences and International Society of Magnetic Resonance. He is considered one of the pioneers in Biological Nuclear Magnetic Resonance (NMR) spectroscopy (Bio-NMR) and his research has been  focused on protein structure, dynamics and stability, and on the relation of these to protein function.  He is a structural biologist and is recognized for his work on the development of NMR spectroscopy for determination of protein structures in solution and characterizing protein dynamics.

Education and early life 
Wagner was born in 1945 in Bor (now in the Czech Republic) but grew up in Southern Bavaria. He  was the first to receive a college education in his family. Born to a blue-collar family, after WWII in the German-speaking part of Czechoslovakia, his family was forced to leave and ended up in Southern Bavaria, where he grew up. Due to his school records he could go to a humanistic gymnasium, an institution that teaches classical antiquity specifically, and received an education with nine years of Latin and six years of classical Greek but also a good education in math and some physics. There, he had an excellent math/physics teacher and became fascinated with physics. Wagner was educated in a classical humanistic high school (humanistic Gymnasium in Germany).

Career and research 
Wagner studied Physics at the Technical University in Munich with work on Mossbauer spectroscopy of iron-containing proteins. He pursued his PhD in Biophysics at the Swiss Federal Institute of Technology (ETH) in Zurich where he graduated in 1977 with studies of protein dynamics, measuring rates of aromatic ring flips and hydrogen exchange.

After graduation, he spent six months at the chemistry department of MIT to explore solid state NMR. After this he went to the laboratory of Kurt Wüthrich at the ETH in Zürich. There he continued to work on solution NMR of proteins. He learned about the nuclear Overhauser effect (nOe) and developed procedures assigning specific NMR resonances to individual amino acids in the sequence of proteins. He was the first to completely assign the resonances of an entire protein, basic pancreatic trypsin inhibitor. This became the foundation of solving protein structures in solution by NMR. The first structure he determined was for rabbit metallothioneine 2. When he and his team were ready to publish it, a crystal structure was reported for the same protein but was entirely different from his topology. After intensive scrutiny of his data it became clear that his structure was correct, and the crystal structure was not. This made the crystallographers aware of him, and he received offers for faculty positions at Duke, the University of Michigan, and the University of Minnesota.

He accepted the position at the University of Michigan in Ann Arbor, where he was hired as associate professor with tenure in 1987. Before his arrival in Michigan, he had ordered construction of a triple resonance probe for his new spectrometer. This allowed pulsing 1H,  13C, and 15N. After the probe was delivered in 1988, he developed triple resonance methods for conformation-independent sequential assignments of proteins. This has become the basis for today’s resonance assignments of proteins and structure determination of proteins in solution up to 50 kDa and above. Due to this achievement, Dr. Wagner was offered a full professorship, with tenure, by Harvard Medical School where he has been since 1990.

After joining the Harvard faculty, he started research on the initiation of mRNA translation into a protein.  After a gene is transcribed into mRNA, a large protein complex attaches to the 5’ end of the mRNA begin the process of translation. In a 2003 Cell paper, Wagner’s lab reported the structure of the first two proteins in this complex, eIF4E and eIF4G, and how they enable the ribosome to bind to the 5’ end of mRNA and start making protein.

In 2017, a research team led by Wagner reported an improved design for tiny nanodiscs; synthetic models of cell membranes used to study proteins that control what enters and leaves a cell. The enhancements provide an unprecedented view of how viruses infect cells.

Award and honors 
1970–1974      Fellowship Studienstiftung des Deutschen Volkes

1977                 ETH Award for PhD Thesis

199                   Zürich Protein Lecture, ETH Zürich

1995/96            Welcome Visiting Professor in Basic Medical Sciences, Kansas State University

1997                 The Wellcome Lecture in Structural Biology, Kansas State University

1999                 Elected Fellow to American Association for the Advancement of Science

2003                 The Cleveland Structural Biology Lecture

2004                 Eastern Analytical Symposium Achievement Award in Magnetic Resonance

2005                 Elected Member to Deutsche Akademie der Naturforscher Leopoldina (German    National Academy)

2008                 Elected Fellow to the International Society of Magnetic Resonance

2011                 Stein and Moore Award of the Protein Society

2011                 Agilent Thought Leader Award

2012                 Mill Hill Lecture 2012

2013                 Elected member of the National Academy of Sciences (US)

2013                 Harvard-Australia Fellowship

2015                 Elected member of the American Academy of Arts and Sciences

In 2018,            Gerhard Wagner was awarded the Gunther Laukien Prize.

Memberships 
American Chemical Society

American Society for the Advancement of Science

American Society for Biochemistry and Molecular Biology

Protein Society

American Biophysical Society

References

Living people
Harvard Medical School faculty
20th-century German physicists
21st-century American physicists
ETH Zurich alumni
1945 births